Aapas Ki Baat is a 1981 Bollywood action romance film directed by Harmesh Malhotra. The movie starred Raj Babbar, Poonam Dhillon, Shakti Kapoor in lead roles.

Plot
This is the love story of Kajal and Anand. Kajal's mother and brother Vinod refuses to accept her affairs but Kajal marry Anand. Later Anand is accused in a serious crime and disappears. Years later a person comes back looking exactly like Anand.

Cast
Raj Babbar as Anand Shrivastav
Poonam Dhillon as Kajal Sinha
Shakti Kapoor as Shyam Shrivastav
Dina Pathak as Mrs. Sinha
Purnima as Laxmi Shrivastav
Abhi Bhattacharya as Seth Narayandas 
Bharat Kapoor as Vinod Sinha 
Narendranath as Bosco
Asrani as Bhola
Kalpana Iyer as Roopa
Huma Khan as Kalpana

Soundtrack
Lyrics: Anjaan

References

External links
 

Films scored by Anu Malik
1981 films
1980s Hindi-language films
Films directed by Harmesh Malhotra